The 6th Panzergrenadier Division (6. Panzergrenadierdivision) was a West German mechanized infantry formation. It was part of the I Corps of the Bundeswehr during peacetime, but fell under Allied Land Forces Schleswig-Holstein and Jutland Command in case of war. In the wake of military restructuring brought about by the end of the Cold War, the 6th Panzergrenadier Division was disbanded in 1994, although a military readiness command incorporated the division's name until 1997.

The then-named 6th Grenadier Division was constituted in November 1958 as part of the I Corps of the Bundeswehr. Initially, the division was organized with two brigade-sized battle-groups, "A6" and "B6". In 1959, these units were renamed and a third brigade was added, with the brigades being the 16 and 17th Panzergrenadier Brigades and the 18th Panzer Brigade. At this time, the division was retitled the 6th Panzergrenadier Division. Division headquarters was located at Neumünster.

The division provided assistance to civilians during floods in 1962 and 1976, and also fought forest and moor fires in 1959.

The division was given the strategic mission of defending Schleswig-Holstein had a Soviet attack against Germany taken place during the Cold War. In such an event, the division would have been subordinated to NATO's AFNORTH command. With the end of the Cold War, the German Army restructured and the 6th Panzergrenadier Division was disbanded in 1994.

Commanders

References

 John Keegan, World Armies, New York: Facts on File, 1979, .

External links 
Panzergrenadierbrigade 16 HERZOGTUM LAUENBURG
Panzergrenadierbrigade 17 HAMBURG

Military units and formations disestablished in 1997
Mechanized divisions of the German Army
Military units and formations established in 1958
1958 establishments in West Germany